The 1994 Tour de France was the 81st edition of Tour de France, one of cycling's Grand Tours. The Tour began in Lille with a prologue individual time trial on 2 July and Stage 11 occurred on 13 July with a mountainous stage from Cahors. The race finished on the Champs-Élysées in Paris on 24 July.

Stage 11
13 July 1994 — Cahors to Lourdes Hautacam,

Stage 12
15 July 1994 — Lourdes to Luz Ardiden,

Stage 13
16 July 1994 — Bagnères-de-Bigorre to Albi,

Stage 14
17 July 1994 — Castres to Montpellier,

Stage 15
18 July 1994 — Montpellier to Carpentras,

Stage 16
19 July 1994 — Valréas to Alpe d'Huez,

Stage 17
20 July 1994 — Le Bourg-d'Oisans to Val Thorens,

Stage 18
21 July 1994 — Moûtiers to Cluses,

Stage 19
22 July 1994 — Cluses to Avoriaz,  (individual time trial)

Stage 20
23 July 1994 — Morzine to Lac Saint-Point,

Stage 21
24 July 1994 — Disneyland Paris to Paris Champs-Élysées,

References

1994 Tour de France
Tour de France stages